Mellom-Vikna is the smallest of the three major islands in the municipality of Nærøysund in Trøndelag county, Norway. The  island is the site of Vikna Wind Farm near Garstad. The island is the middle island of the three main islands, hence its name which means "middle-Vikna". The Norwegian County Road 770 connects the three islands to the mainland via the Nærøysund Bridge.

See also
List of islands of Norway

References

Islands of Trøndelag
Nærøysund
Vikna